Edward Henry Berge (1876–1924) was an American sculptor. He is mainly known for his bronze monumental works and figures, created in the traditional manner in contrast with the avant-garde work of his contemporaries.

Berhe was born in Baltimore, Maryland in 1876. He studied at the Maryland Institute (currently known as the Maryland Institute College of Art or MICA) and was part of the first class of the Rinehart School of Sculpture, which comprised three boys and four girls. The other two boys were J. Maxwell Miller and Hans Schuler. Upon completion of Rinehart School study, the three went together to Paris where they enrolled in the Académie Julian for three years and studied under Raoul Verlet and Auguste Rodin.  Berge was a member of the National Sculpture Society and the National Arts Club. He died in his native city in 1924. His son, Henry Berge (1908–1998) was also a sculptor and focused on bas-relief.


Sculpture
Berge mainly worked in marble and bronze and completed many monuments, portrait busts and relief sculptures, many of which are on display outdoors or in public buildings in Baltimore City, including:
 Armistead, Fort McHenry.
 Chapin A. Harris, Wyman Parkway and 31st St.
 Latrobe, Broadway and Baltimore St.
 On the Trail, Clifton Park.
 Sea Urchin, Johns Hopkins University.
 War Memorial, Cherry Hill Administration Building.
 Watson, Mt. Royal Terrace at North Ave.
 Wildflower, Homeland Garden.
 Muse Finding the Head of Orpheus, Walters Art Museum (original stone maquette), Lorraine Park Cemetery (bronze at Berge family plot).

References

Further reading
Peter Falk, Who Was Who in American Art, Madison, CT: Sound View Press, September 1999.
Berge, Stephens. Edward Berge: A Short Biography, 1983.
Naylor, Henry and Caroline. Public Monuments & Sculpture of Baltimore: An Introduction to the Collection, (Bethesda, Md.: The Writer's Center), 1987.
Baltimore Museum of Art, Memorial Exhibition of Sculpture by Edward Berge. (Baltimore, MD),  1925.

External links

 Sculptor Edward Berge

1876 births
1924 deaths
People from Baltimore
20th-century American sculptors
20th-century American male artists
American male sculptors
Maryland Institute College of Art alumni